Nobody's Children is a 1994 American TV film directed by David Wheatley. The film was written by Petru Popescu and Iris Friedman for USA Pictures. The film concerns an American couple's battle through bureaucracy to adopt a Romanian child.

Cast
Ann-Margret as Carol Stevens
Dominique Sanda as Stephanie Vaugier
Jay O. Sanders as Joe Stevens
Reiner Schöne as Sorin Dornescu
Clive Owen as Corneliu Bratu
Allan Corduner as Ion
Katrin Cartlidge as Viorica
Leon Lissek as Dr. Preda

References

1994 films
American television films
Films shot in Romania